Pyotr Danilovich Draganov (– February 7, 1928) was a Russian philologist and slavist.

Biography 
Draganov was born in Komrat, Russian Empire in 1857. He was a Bessarabian Bulgarian. Draganov studied history and philology at the University of Saint Petersburg. From 1885 to 1887 he was working as a teacher in Thessaloniki after he was invited by the Bulgarian Exarchate.

He came to Thessaloniki with the claim that the Slavic speakers in Ottoman Macedonia are Bulgarians. However, after the huge research that he has done in Macedonia he came up with his own scientific opinion about them. In other words, Draganov claimed that Macedonia is a separate ethno-geographic unit of the Balkans and the Macedonian dialects form a separate language. In St. Petersburg, the prominent Slavist Pyotr A. Lavrov criticized the Draganov concept. As a result of this claim and his personal beliefs, he was sent back to Russia, where he set the foundations of Macedonian studies.

References

External links 
 Petar Draganov for the ethnography of the Macedonian Slavs (English)
 The nasal vowels in the Macedonian and Bulgarian dialects
 Studying contemporary Macedonia in ethnographic, statistic and dialectal sense

Linguists from Russia
Bessarabian Bulgarians
People from Comrat
Early Macedonists
1857 births
1928 deaths